Pouteria fossicola is a species of plant in the family Sapotaceae. It is found in Costa Rica and Panama.

References

fossicola
Vulnerable plants
Taxonomy articles created by Polbot
Taxa named by Arthur Cronquist